Sumter County is the name of four counties in the United States:

 Sumter County, Alabama
 Sumter County, Florida
 Sumter County, Georgia
 Sumter County, South Carolina